Oleg Dmitriyevich Baklanov (17 March 1932 – 28 July 2021) was a Soviet politician, and high functionary in government and industry. He was a scientist and businessman. As Minister of General Machine Building, he was responsible for the Soviet space industry during the 1980s.

Biography 
Baklanov worked in an instrument engineering factory in Kharkov, Soviet Ukraine, and later became chief of the factory. He was appointed Engineering Industry Minister of the Soviet Union in 1983 and was a deputy to the Supreme Soviet from 1981 to 1991.

Baklanov was a secretary of the CPSU Central Committee from February 1988 to April 1991 and was responsible for defense issues in this role. He was a member of the State Committee on the State of Emergency during the 1991 Soviet coup d'état attempt.

From March until his arrest on August 23, 1991 he was the First Deputy Chairman of the Defense Council under the President of the Soviet Union (he was formally dismissed from office a month after his arrest).

Baklanov was brutally beaten and arrested by the security police for his role in the 1991 coup d'état attempt. He was released on recognizance not to leave in January 1993 and amnestied by the State Duma in 1994. After his release, he became the chairman of the board of governors at the Rosobshemash company.

Death 
Baklanov died on 28 July 2021, and was buried in the Federal Military Memorial Cemetery on 30 July. Prior to his death he was the last surviving member of the State Committee on the State of Emergency.

Honours and awards
 Hero of Socialist Labour (1976)
 Order of Lenin (1976)
 Order of the October Revolution
 Order of the Red Banner of Labour, twice
 Order of the Badge of Honour (1960)
 Lenin Prize (1982)
 Chairman of the Society of Friendship and cooperation between the peoples of Ukraine and Russia
 Member of the Presidium of the Russian Academy of Cosmonautics Tsiolkovsky
 International Academy of Information Technology
 Academician of the Academy of Security, Defence and Law Enforcement.

References

1932 births
2021 deaths
20th-century Russian engineers
Politicians from Kharkiv
Central Committee of the Communist Party of the Soviet Union members
Expelled members of the Communist Party of the Soviet Union
State Committee on the State of Emergency members
Eleventh convocation members of the Soviet of the Union
Heroes of Socialist Labour
Lenin Prize winners
Recipients of the Order of Lenin
Recipients of the Order of the Red Banner of Labour
Soviet engineers
Burials at the Federal Military Memorial Cemetery